The M4 Motorway is a highway in north-west Syria, which runs parallel with its northern border with Turkey.

The M4 runs from Latakia to Saraqib, where it intersects with the "International Road" M5. It also connects Arihah and Jisr al-Shughur. Assuming that it shares 60 km with the M5, it arrives until Aleppo, and from there, it has been expanded as a two-lane expressway that continues further east into the Iraqi border, ultimately reaching its destination at Mosul.

In October 2019, the highway became a warzone, as Turkish-backed Syrian rebel forces advanced into the Kurdish-controlled region of Rojava. Civilians have been killed near the motorway. Turkish media also reported that it was the goal of the 2019 Turkish offensive into north-eastern Syria to reach the M4 highway in the Turkish occupation of northern Syria.

On 25 May 2020, the highway was reopened for the first time in seven months since October 2019 in northeastern Syria, after Russian mediation to reopen parts of the road captured last year by Turkish-backed opposition fighters.

See also 
Transport in Syria
Idlib demilitarization (2018–2019)

References 

Roads in Syria